What's Bugging Seth is a 2005 drama film directed by Eli Steele and starring Ross Thomas, Amy Purdy, and Nora Kirkpatrick. The screenplay concerns a young deaf man striving for success in his own business. It found success on the film festival circuit and was released on DVD in the beginning of 2008.

Synopsis
Seth Singer, a young deaf man, believes in one thing: that he is no different from anyone else. Determined to prove his point, he throws his life savings into a pesticide business despite the presence of a well-established competitor. Along the way, Seth meets Alma, a double amputee, and they find romance as they bond over their disabilities. However, their relationship is threatened by the return of Nora, Seth’s high school girlfriend, who comes home after a disappointing modeling career.

Cast
 Ross Thomas
 Amy Purdy
 Nora Kirkpatrick

Awards
 Winner, Fargo Film Festival
 Winner, San Fernando Valley International Film Festival
 Winner, Santa Cruz Film Festival
 Winner, Ft. Lauderdale Film Festival
 Winner, Empire Film Festival
 Winner, Real to Reel Film Festival
 Winner, DancesWithFilms Film Festival

DVD
What's Bugging Seth is available on DVD at www.whatsbuggingseth.com

External links
 
 Official Site

2005 films
2005 drama films
American drama films
2000s English-language films
2000s American films